Far East Air Force may refer to:
 Far East Air Force (Royal Air Force), the British command that controlled all Royal Air Force units in East Asia from 1943 to 1971
 Far East Air Force (United States), the military aviation organization of the United States Army in the Philippine Islands from November 1941 to February 1942
 Pacific Air Forces, a United States Air Force major command known historically as Far East Air Forces from its activation in 1944 until 1945 and again from 1947 to 1957